Leweston School is an independent day and boarding school near Sherborne in Dorset, England. The school is co-educational in the Nursery and Preparatory School and follows the co-educational diamond model in the Senior School and Sixth Form. The School consists of a Nursery (3 months - 4years), Prep School (4–11 years), Senior School (11–16 years) and Sixth Form (16–18 years).  Leweston's values are based upon a supportive Catholic ethos. In 2017, Leweston announced that it was moving to a diamond model for the delivery of STEM subjects in Years 9 to 11 whilst becoming co-educational in all years during a four-year transitional period from 2018 to 2021.

Leweston School is operated by a charitable foundation and company, 'Leweston School Trust', which is registered charity no. 295175. The Trust, registered company no. 02041443, was incorporated on 28 July 1986 to provide 
pre-primary education, primary education and general secondary education. Prior to 27 December 2007, the Trust's legal name was St Antony's Lewiston School Trust.
The Trust's primary aim is to provide an independent Roman Catholic education. As of 2023, it listed 12 trustees and 180 employees. Ian Lucas was listed as Chairman of the Governors. The 2018 financial report stated that its strategic vision was based on providing "high quality, competitively priced education".

History
Leweston School was founded in Sherborne as St Antony's school in 1891 by the Sisters of Christian Instruction, Sacred Heart nuns from Belgium with Jesuit principles. They operated a school for girl boarders. The senior school moved to the Leweston Manor estate in 1948 and became known as St Antony's-Leweston School; in 1993 the Preparatory school followed.

The manor building was Grade II listed in 1951 as "Saint Antony's Convent (formerly listed as Leweston Manor)". At the time, a convent still existed there, but the primary use of the building was as the school. The listing states that the interior was "largely remodelled c.1930" and that the additions completed in the mid 20th century were "not of special interest".

The main school building is a Palladian manor house built in the late eighteenth century. The first owner during the 20th century, in 1906, was George Hamilton Fletcher of the White Star shipping line who sold the property to Eric Hamilton Rose in the 1920s. Rose dubbed it Leweston Manor; he and his wife Rosamond arranged for major renovations to be completed. It was sold in 1948 to the nuns of St Antony's School, who sold the freehold in 1990; it has since remained a Roman Catholic school, renamed Leweston School in 2007. The current owner has maintained the historic integrity of the manor and chapel.

The school grounds occupy , and include the Chapel of the Holy Trinity, a Grade I listed building, constructed in 1616 by Sir John Fitzjames. The Trinity Chapel is the oldest building on the school site and is used regularly for smaller services.

Most of this chapel's interior is from the 17th century, including the two-decker pulpit, but the original altar is missing; the current altar was added in the 1930s. There is another chapel situated in the main school. It is modern, completed in 1970, with a triangular plan.

Notable alumni
Dido Harding, Baroness Harding of Winscombe - businesswoman and Conservative life peer
Erin Pizzey - Equality activist and founder of world's first domestic violence shelter
Kristin Scott Thomas - Actress
Serena Scott Thomas - Actress

References

External links
 Official site
 Profile on the Independent Schools Council website

Educational institutions established in 1891
Private schools in Dorset
Girls' schools in Dorset
1891 establishments in England
Roman Catholic private schools in the Diocese of Plymouth
Member schools of the Girls' Schools Association
Boarding schools in Dorset
Catholic boarding schools in England
West Dorset District
Diamond schools